My Little Pony: A New Generation is a 2021 computer-animated  fantasy comedy film directed by Robert Cullen and José L. Ucha, co-directed by Mark Fattibene with Cecil Kramer and Peter Lewis as producers, and written by Gillian Berrow and Tim Sullivan from a story by Cullen, Ucha and Sullivan. Based on Hasbro's My Little Pony franchise, the film marks the start of the fifth incarnation of the franchise, which is set to serve as the official sequel to the previous generation, a first for the franchise.

The film stars Vanessa Hudgens, Kimiko Glenn, James Marsden, Sofia Carson and Liza Koshy as the main characters. A New Generation is set many years after the events of My Little Pony: Friendship Is Magic, in a magic-less era where the story of Twilight Sparkle and her friends has become a mere legend, and the three pony kinds – earth ponies, pegasi, and unicorns – have grown apart, living separated from one another in paranoia and prejudice. The film follows Sunny Starscout, an earth pony who, after meeting the unicorn Izzy Moonbow, embarks on a quest to reunite all pony kinds and restore magic to the land.

Originally set to be released theatrically by Paramount Pictures, the film was instead released in most countries on Netflix on September 24, 2021, due to the COVID-19 pandemic, while still being theatrically released in several Asian countries. The film received mostly positive reviews from critics for its message, though its pacing and writing received some criticism, and was the most-viewed film on Netflix in October 2021.

A tie-in video game titled My Little Pony: A Maretime Bay Adventure was released for Microsoft Windows, Nintendo Switch, PlayStation 4, and Xbox One on May 27, 2022, and for Google Stadia on June 28, 2022. A follow-up television series, My Little Pony: Make Your Mark, is currently in production by Atomic Cartoons and Entertainment One, and debuted on Netflix on May 26, 2022. A singalong version of the film was released on Netflix on July 18, 2022.

Plot
In the earth pony town of Maretime Bay, Argyle Starshine teaches his daughter Sunny Starscout about tales of old Equestria when earth ponies, pegasi and unicorns lived in harmony. Although most earth ponies dismiss these ideas as myths and now live in fear of the other races, Sunny hopes that all races can make amends and live in harmony.

Years later, Sunny continuously tries to change the minds of the other earth ponies, disrupting a showcase of anti-pegasi and unicorn technology by factory owner Phyllis Cloverleaf. Hitch Trailblazer, Sunny's childhood friend and sheriff of Maretime Bay, pulls her away and prepares to send her back home with the warning that she is jeopardizing their friendship with her activities. Suddenly, a unicorn named Izzy Moonbow wanders into the town. While most of the earth ponies flee, Sunny befriends Izzy and quickly takes her to her home to hide from Hitch and his deputy Sprout, Phyllis' son. Learning from Izzy that unicorns have lost their magic and that the pegasi may be to blame, Sunny travels with her to the pegasus city of Zephyr Heights in order to ask for their help. The two elude Hitch and flee town, and Hitch leaves Sprout in charge while he pursues them. Sprout names himself sheriff and eventually becomes a dictator-like leader, turning the residents of Maretime Bay into a hostile mob and commandeering his mother's factory to construct a war machine.

Sunny and Izzy are caught in Zephyr Heights and taken to meet Queen Haven and her two daughters, Pipp Petals and Zipp Storm, who seem to be the only pegasi who can fly. When Sunny starts asking about magic, Haven has them imprisoned in the castle dungeon. Zipp secretly visits them there and tells them that the pegasi have also lost their magic and cannot fly, and the royal family uses wires to give the illusion of flight. She helps them escape and takes them to an abandoned transit station that Sunny realizes was used by all pony races in the past. Sunny finds a set of stained glass windows depicting two crystals – one of which is set in Haven's crown – that may fit together and bring back the magic. The three concoct a plan to steal the crown during Pipp's performance that night. Hitch's arrival triggers a series of mishaps that reveal the royals' inability to fly; Haven is arrested, and the sisters are forced to flee. While Pipp is initially angry with her sister, she returns the crystal and helps the group escape the city. Hitch overcomes his own prejudices and offers to help Sunny in her effort to reunite the pony races.

Izzy escorts the group to her home in the forest village of Bridlewood and disguises them as unicorns before leading them to Alphabittle, who holds the unicorn crystal. Sunny wins it from him in a dance competition, but loses her disguise as she celebrates. As the group flees with the two crystals, they come across Haven, who has also escaped. Sunny and Izzy try to put the two crystals together, but they have no effect. Dejected, Sunny gives back the crystals and returns to Maretime Bay with Hitch.

While packing up her childhood toys, Sunny finds a third crystal intended to join with the other two, built into a lamp her father had made for her. As she races to tell Hitch, they discover that Sprout has turned the entire town to his side and is piloting his war machine to attack the other pony races. Sunny and Hitch rush back to her home as Izzy, Pipp, Zipp, Haven, and Alphabittle arrive. Gathering the crystals, Sunny, Izzy, and Pipp try to put them together while Hitch and Zipp hold off Sprout's machine. Phyllis orders Sprout to stop, but he refuses and crashes into Sunny's home, destroying it and the frame in which the crystals must be set. Phyllis, Haven, Alphabittle, and Sunny's friends put aside their differences and come together to comfort her amid the rubble. In response, the crystals activate and lift Sunny into the air, temporarily transforming her into an alicorn and restoring magic across the land. Sunny and her friends celebrate as the ponies of all three races cooperate to fix the damage done by Sprout and a new era of peace begins.

Cast
 Vanessa Hudgens as Sunny Starscout, an adventurous and virtuous earth pony-turned-alicorn who enjoys roller skating and wants all pony kinds to get along, and tries to return magic to the world in order to unite the three types of ponies as equals
 Kimiko Glenn as Izzy Moonbow, an energetic and curious unicorn from the Bridlewood Forest that loves crafting, who is the first non-earth pony Sunny befriended
 James Marsden as Hitch Trailblazer, an earth pony who is the kind and hard-working sheriff at Maretime Bay and Sunny's childhood friend
 Sofia Carson as Pipp Petals, a  Pegasus princess from Zephyr Heights who is a talented pop icon and loves to be a good influence on others and entertain other ponies with her music
 Liza Koshy as Zephyrina "Zipp" Storm, Pipp's older sister and a rebellious Pegasus princess from Zephyr Heights who enjoys athletics and science
 Elizabeth Perkins as Phyllis Cloverleaf, an earth pony who owns Canterlogic, a company specializing in products to keep earth ponies "safe and stylish"
 Jane Krakowski as Queen Haven, a pegasus who is the mother of Pipp and Zipp and the monarch of Zephyr Heights
 Ken Jeong as Sprout Cloverleaf, an earth pony stallion, Phyllis' son, and deputy sheriff to Hitch at Maretime Bay
 Alan Schmuckler provides Sprout's singing voice.
 Phil LaMarr as Alphabittle, a unicorn stallion from the Bridlewood Forest
 Michael McKean as Argyle Starshine, Sunny's father who tells her stories about Twilight Sparkle and her friends

Additionally, Arturo Hernández voices Jasper, Thunder, and Toots; Brooke Goldner voices Sweets; Gillian Berrow voices Zoom; Heather Langenkamp voices Dazzle Feather and Mayflower; Will Friedle voices Comet Tail, Glitter Cupcake and Skye Silver; and director Robert Cullen voices Sparkle Chaser, Rob the Pony and Wings. The voice actresses from My Little Pony: Friendship Is Magic television series – Tara Strong as Twilight Sparkle, Ashleigh Ball as Applejack and Rainbow Dash, Tabitha St. Germain as Rarity, and Andrea Libman as Fluttershy and Pinkie Pie – briefly reprise their roles in the film's opening scene.

Production

Development
In February 2019, it was reported that Hasbro was developing a computer-animated My Little Pony feature film. Reports later said that the film would mark the beginning of the franchise's fifth-generation, which was confirmed on September 17, 2020; My Little Pony: Friendship Is Magic creator Lauren Faust first hinted that Hasbro was working on the fifth incarnation in 2018, when she denied any involvement on the franchise's next incarnation. On October 8, 2020, it was reported that the fifth incarnation, including the film, would center on a new set of characters, though with the possibility of characters from the previous incarnation appearing.

On January 29, 2021, Emily Thompson, Entertainment One's VP of global brand management, revealed that the film would be set in the same world as the fourth incarnation of the franchise, while still serving as the first entry in the fifth incarnation, being set years after the events depicted in the previous incarnation. Thompson explained that her decision was made because the producers felt it would have "felt wrong" to not to further explore the lore and worldbuilding established by the fourth incarnation.

On February 12, 2021, it was reported that the founder of Boulder Media, Robert Cullen, along with José Ucha would serve as directors, with Mark Fattibene set to co-direct the film. Cecil Kramer and Peter Lewis were also announced as producers for the film. Executive producers include former Friendship Is Magic co-showrunner and writer Meghan McCarthy and Allspark Animation president Stephen Davis.

Voice cast and recording
On June 30, 2021, Vanessa Hudgens, Kimiko Glenn, James Marsden, Sofia Carson, Liza Koshy, Jane Krakowski, Ken Jeong, Phil LaMarr, and Michael McKean were revealed to be the film's main cast. Part of the film's recording sessions had to be done remotely due to the COVID-19 pandemic; Koshy felt that working during the pandemic encompassed with the film's message about "not leaning into the fear". Koshy was encouraged by Glenn to ad-lib lines during recording.

While Tara Strong, voice actress for Twilight Sparkle, said that she would not reprise her role in the fifth incarnation in April 2020 (due to reprising her role in My Little Pony: Pony Life), she ultimately reprised her role alongside fellow Friendship Is Magic cast members Andrea Libman, Ashleigh Ball, and Tabitha St. Germain for the film's prologue.

Animation
The film's animation services were provided by Hasbro-owned Irish animation studio Boulder Media. Unlike previous My Little Pony media, the film was animated entirely through computer-animation. Although, the brief introductory flashback, which features the "Mane Six" from My Little Pony: Friendship Is Magic, was done with traditional animation in the style of the series. 48 animators worked on the film remotely due to the COVID-19 pandemic. According to animation supervisor Graham Grallagher, the filmmakers were inspired by several My Little Pony series for the ponies' anthropomorphic design.

Music
Songwriters Alan Schmuckler and Michael Mahler composed songs for the film. Director Robert Cullen said the filmmakers wanted the soundtracks to "have an eclectic range of genres in the songs", in order to make it "as unpredictable as [they] can" in hopes of defying the audiences' expectations regarding the soundtrack. On September 2, 2021, the song "Glowin' Up", performed by Sofia Carson and written by Jenna Andrews, Bryan Fryzel, and Taylor Upsahl, was released as a single. The second single, "It's Alright" by Johnny Orlando, was released on September 17, 2021. In November 2021, "Fit Right In" was also released as the third single. Heitor Pereira did the original score for the film.

The film's soundtrack was released alongside the film on September 24, 2021.

Release
My Little Pony: A New Generation was released on September 24, 2021, by Netflix. The film was originally slated to be released theatrically on the same day by Paramount Pictures. However, eOne sold the distribution rights to Netflix in February 2021 due to the COVID-19 pandemic, while retaining them in China. In some regions, the film was released theatrically as well as on Netflix. In Russia, the film was distributed by Central Partnership and released theatrically on September 23, 2021; early premiere screenings were held in multiple locations on September 18. In Hong Kong, the film is being distributed by Intercontinental Group and was released theatrically in Cantonese and English on September 22, 2021. In South Korea, the film is being distributed by BoXoo Entertainment and was also released theatrically on September 22. In Singapore and Taiwan, the film was distributed by Encore Films and GaragePlay respectively, and was released theatrically on September 24, 2021.

Reception
 the film has grossed $1.5 million internationally, including $1.4 million in Russia and $36,788 in South Korea across 1694 theaters. A New Generation opened in 1677 theaters in Russia and South Korea, and grossed $726,619 in the former and $16,304 in the latter on the opening weekend.

On Rotten Tomatoes, the film has a rating of 92% based on 12 reviews with an average rating of 7.40/10. 
Courtney Howard from Variety gave the film a mostly positive review. She praised the film for "[retaining] its predecessors' lively, spirited drive centered on friendship, empowerment and magic," though was critical of some plot aspects. Beatrice Loayza of The New York Times gave an overall mixed review of the film, mainly criticizing the switch from traditional animation to "creepily-anthropomorphized, digitally-animated brethren"; she compared some plot points to Raya and the Last Dragon, which was released earlier in the year. But overall, Loayza said, "...the film's messaging about unity and the need for a new generation to band together against misinformation and rabble rousing isn't the worst thing."

Three days after its release, A New Generation became the second-most popular film on Netflix, and stayed in the top three for the rest of the week. It was the most-viewed film of October 2021 on Netflix; A New Generation was also the twenty-first most-watched film of 2021.

Awards and nominations

Follow-ups
Prior to the film's release, during the 2021 Hasbro Investor Event in February that year, the company announced three untitled projects tied to the fifth incarnation of the toyline (also referred to as the fifth generation or "G5") as part of their My Little Pony content slate for 2022—an animated web series and two Netflix specials.

Following the cancellation of the film's theatrical release, Hasbro and Netflix later announced a fourth project—a 3D computer-animated streaming television series titled My Little Pony: Make Your Mark—would also be released on the streaming platform, following the film. Jenna Warren, Maitreyi Ramakrishnan, Ana Sani, AJ Bridel, and J.J. Gerber were revealed as the voice cast for the "Mane 5"—the characters of Sunny Starscout, Zipp Storm, Izzy Moonbow, Pipp Petals, and Hitch Trailblazer—in all four projects. Developed by Gillian Berrow (who also served as an animation writer and literary author on the Equestria Girls franchise and Friendship Is Magic television series) and co-produced by the Canadian animation studio Atomic Cartoons and Entertainment One, My Little Pony: Make Your Mark debuted with the special "Make Your Mark" on May 26, 2022, that served as set-up for the main eight-episode series which premiered on September 26, 2022, on Netflix.

A 2D animated made-for-YouTube short-form web series, My Little Pony: Tell Your Tale, premiered on April 7, 2022, with episodes being released weekly. The series is produced by Malaysian animation studio Lil Critter Workshop, and is expected to consist of 70 episodes, with Gretchen Mallorie serving as story writer.

A CGI-animated Christmas-themed special, My Little Pony: Winter Wishday, premiered on November 21, 2022, on Netflix, tied to the Make Your Mark series.

A comic series following up on the movie was announced by IDW Publishing in February 2022, and began publication in late May the same year. Its plot reveals and explores the events which led to the loss of magic in Equestria prior to the film, and what happened to the characters and settings from Friendship Is Magic.

Notes

References

External links
 
 
 

2021 computer-animated films
2021 films
American computer-animated films
Canadian computer-animated films
Irish animated films
2020s English-language films
English-language Netflix original films
Entertainment One films
My Little Pony films
Films impacted by the COVID-19 pandemic
Films scored by Heitor Pereira
Films about prejudice
Racism in fiction
Irish children's films
2020s Canadian films
2020s American films